Orestias laucaensis is a species of fish in the family Cyprinodontidae. It is endemic to the Lauca River in Chile.

Sources

laucaensis
Freshwater fish of Chile
Near threatened animals
Fish described in 1982
Taxonomy articles created by Polbot